Chip Hooper and Mike Leach were the defending champions, but none competed this year.

Sergio Casal and Emilio Sánchez won the title by defeating Jorge Lozano and Diego Pérez 6–2, 6–2 in the final.

Seeds

Draw

Draw

References

External links
 Official results archive (ATP)
 Official results archive (ITF)

Sul America Open Doubles
Sul America Open Doubles